The Harding Bisons football program represents Harding University in college football as a Division II member of the Great American Conference. Harding is located in Searcy, Arkansas. The Bisons are led by head coach Paul Simmons, a former Harding linebacker, with a record of 50-13. Simmons has coached the Bisons to four playoff appearances in a row, not counting the cancelled 2020 season.

The back-to-back 2016 and 2017 seasons were the most successful run in the history of the program. Ronnie Huckeba's 2016 squad, before his retirement from coaching, won the conference title before making it to the quarterfinals of the NCAA Division II playoffs. The following year under first-year head coach Simmons, the Bisons won three post-season games to make it to the semifinals of the playoffs before losing to Texas A&M-Commerce (the storied football program formerly and widely known as East Texas State).

There are 52 former Bison football players who have earned All-American status, either on the NAIA or the NCAA Division II levels.

History
Harding's football program began the same year that Harding College came into existence in 1924. The first eight years produced a 19-28-6 record, with most of the wins coming against high schools or college B and C teams. But the Bisons cultivated a steady following of excited students and townspeople, as evidenced in various volumes of Harding's yearbook, The Petit Jean.

Among the opponents in the 1920s were five colleges that would become rivalries lasting into the 21st century. Arkansas State Teacher's College would eventually become the University of Central Arkansas, and Magnolia A&M would become Southern Arkansas University. Henderson State University had begun as Arkadelphia Methodist College and was referred to as Henderson-Brown when Harding began playing them. Harding first played against Arkansas Tech University's Third Team in 1924, and advanced to playing Tech's Second Team the next year. The first matchup against the Ouachita Baptist Tigers was in 1928, ending in a 0-0 tie. 

One special moment in Harding football history was a 1926 trip to Fayetteville, Arkansas, and a drubbing by the Arkansas Razorback Freshman Team. The head coach of the Razorbacks was Francis Schmidt, who was nicknamed Francis "Close the Gates of Mercy" Schmidt. He loved to run the score up on lesser equipped teams.   Harding, with many first-year players itself that year, was beaten badly by the Razorback freshmen, 0-74. 

As the effects of the Great Depression began to set in, the Harding College football program folded after the 1931 season due to the economic hardship. The Petit Jean yearbook included an ominous entry in regard to the football team's finances in 1931:

The hope of again fielding an intercollegiate team was still alive through Harding College's dormant football years of 1932-1958. One of Coach Paul Fiser's prized players in 1931 was Ervin "Pinky" Berryhill. Berryhill would one day be the man to serve as athletics director when the intercollegiate football program would finally be reinstated almost three decades later in 1959. 

Intercollegiate athletics for all sports (football, basketball, baseball, all men's and women's sports) at Harding were disbanded in the 1930s due to the depression economy. In its place, led by former Harding athlete and then-current faculty member Berryhill, the Harding administration approved intramural competition on campus. As a result, 1939 saw “football” come back to the Harding campus in the form of two-hand touch intramural teams. Less than a decade later, the form of intra campus football had turned to “ragtag” ball, or flag football.  Some future Harding assistant coaches and academic professors were members of these teams, including Clifton L. Ganus Jr., who would later become president of Harding University from 1965-1987.

The fall of 1955 saw the return of full pads tackle football to Harding, in the form of intramural teams of 8-man football composed of students. Enough players showed up each autumn to form four teams of on-campus 8-man tackle football from 1955 to 1958. An All-Star game at the end of each season, which came to be called The Bison All-Star Game, came complete with the honoring of maids and a queen of the highlighted all-star game.  By year-two of fully padded 8-man tackle football, 1956, the student association sponsored a game each Saturday night,  so that the excitement of Saturday college football was back at Harding College. Autumn of 1957 saw the return of several intercollegiate sports for Harding, but football still had to wait two more years. Several of the players on these 8-man tackle intramural teams would go on to be part of the 1959 reemergence of Harding Bisons football on the intercollegiate level.

The main impactful decision by Athletics Director Pinky Berryhill in leading Harding back into intercollegiate football in 1959 was the recruitment and hiring of an Oklahoma Sooner football legend.

The Harding football program was reignited from the ground up in 1959 by former legendary Oklahoma Sooner player Carl Allison, who had been a rare four-year starter for the Sooners during the Bud Wilkinson dynasty. He was a captain on OU's 1954 undefeated team, and was drafted in the 22nd round of the 1955 NFL Draft by the Chicago Bears., coached by George Halas.

Oklahoma head coach Wilkinson, the former three-time national championship player in the 1930s Bernie Bierman University of Minnesota dynasty, heaped arguably the greatest praise of any player he ever coached onto Carl Allison:

Bud Wilkinson's high praise of Allison as a leader and player came almost a decade after Wilkinson himself had created the Oklahoma drill, a drill meant to weed out hundreds of former World War II soldiers trying out for the Oklahoma Sooners football team on the G.I. Bill.

Carl Allison did not make the cut for the Chicago Bears roster, and instead instantly became the head football coach at Clinton (OK) High School. Moving straight from the playing field to head coach, he took what he had learned playing for Wilkinson at Oklahoma, and became part of the Bud Wilkinson coaching tree. He hired another first year coach, John Prock, a former three-year starting lineman at Southwestern Oklahoma State. The former coach at Hollis, Oklahoma, Joe Bailey Metcalf, had taken the Southwestern job and recruited his old player Prock to Weatherford, as Prock was returning home from military service in Korea. Prock had grown up in Hollis around future Texas Longhorn coach Darrell Royal, who had also played at Oklahoma under Bud Wilkinson, and who also revered the mentorship of Coach Joe Metcalf.

Carl Allison and his assistant Prock then joined forces to restart the Harding football program in Searcy, Arkansas. When Allison briefly returned to Norman as a scout for the Oklahoma Sooners, John Prock became Harding's head coach and would serve in that capacity for the next two-plus decades. He would go on to coach the next three future Harding head coaches, as well as hiring two of them, Randy Tribble and Ronnie Huckeba, as long-time assistants.

Counting Allison and Prock restarting the Harding football program, the Bisons have had only 6 head coaches in the last 60-plus years. Larry Richmond, Tribble and Huckeba, all had winning records, as does current coach Paul Simmons, who has become the winningest percentage coach in Harding's history.

Harding's historic influence from the state of Oklahoma made for significant football recruiting inroads into the Sooner state. With the latter influence of long-term assistant coaches, some of whom became Harding head coaches, a much wider permanent net was cast throughout the most fertile recruiting grounds of the south. Richmond was a Memphis native, but had also coached in Louisiana and Texas. Tribble was a Florida native who also had coached in Texas, and Huckeba was a Georgia native who had previously coached in Texas and Louisiana. Today's Harding football recruiting base is nationwide and beyond.

Conference championships

† Denotes shared title.

Conference affiliations
1924–1931: Independent
1960–1994: Arkansas Intercollegiate Conference
1995–1996: NAIA Independent
1997–1999; Lone Star Conference
2000–2010: Gulf South Conference
2011–present: Great American Conference

No team from 1932 to 1958

Playoff appearances

The Bisons participated in the NAIA Division I Playoffs twice: 1989 and 1992

The Bisons have participated in the NCAA Division II Playoffs seven times: 2012, 2014, 2016, 2017, 2018, 2019 and 2021.

Bowl games
The Bisons have participated in three College Division bowl games.

Records against historic rivals

Arkansas Tech: 28-31
Arkansas-Monticello: 33-24
Central Arkansas: 6-30-3
Henderson State: 24-33-1
Lane College: 15-1
Millsaps College: 10-2-2
Northwestern Oklahoma: 12-4
Ouachita Baptist: 33-26-4
College of the Ozarks: 6-5
Southeastern Oklahoma: 24-8
Southern Arkansas: 29-28-1
Southwestern Oklahoma: 10-4
Tarleton State: 6-2-1
West Alabama: 6-8

List of head coaches
Earl B. Thompson: 1924-1924 (2–2–0)
Clint Kercheville: 1925-1925 (2–3–1)
Clyde Matthews: 1926-1926 (1-5-0)
W.T. Henry: 1927-1927 (0–8–1)
Frank Turbeville: 1928-1928 (3-1–2)
Buck Arnold: 1929–1930 (7–6–2)
Paul Fiser: 1931-1931 (4–3–0)
Carl Allison: 1959–1963 (13–26–3)
John Prock: 1964–1987 (114–123–7)
Larry Richmond: 1988–1993 (37–25–1)
Randy Tribble: 1994–2007 (74–62–1)
Ronnie Huckeba: 2007–2016 (49–35–0)
Paul Simmons: 2017–Present (50–13–0)

List of Harding players in professional football
Ronnie Peacock: 1972 - Pittsburgh Steelers 
Tom Ed Gooden: 1974 - Cleveland Browns
Alan Dixon: 1974 - Minnesota Vikings
Barney Crawford: 1975 - Miami Dolphins
 Bruce Baldwin: 1983 - Denver Broncos 
Gill Stegall: 1985 - Denver Gold (USFL): 1986 - Tampa Bay Bandits (USFL), Montreal Alouettes (CFL): 1987 - Montreal Alouettes (CFL), St Louis Cardinals: 1988 - Detroit Lions
Tank Daniels: 2006 - Philadelphia Eagles: 2007 - New York Giants: 2008 - New York Giants, Philadelphia Eagles: 2009 - Hartford Colonials, Jacksonville Jaguars 
Kurt Adams: 2011-12 - Winnipeg Blue Bombers 
Eddie Russ: 2011-13 - Saskatchewan Roughriders 
Rene Stephan: 2012-14 - Winnipeg Blue Bombers
Ty Powell: 2013 - Seattle Seahawks, NY Giants: 2013-2015 - Buffalo Bills: 2016 - Philadelphia Eagles
Donatella Luckett: 2015 - Kansas City Chiefs, San Diego Chargers

List of Harding players in the Super Bowl

Tank Daniels: 2007 - New York Giants

References

External links
 

 
Football